Joe Sweet (born July 5, 1948) is a former professional wide receiver for the Los Angeles Rams

Sweet attended Rochelle High School in Lakeland, Florida. In college he attended Tennessee State University.

References

1948 births
Living people
Los Angeles Rams players
American football wide receivers
New England Patriots players
San Diego Chargers players
Tennessee State Tigers football players